Caladenia brunonis, commonly known as the purple enamel orchid, is a plant in the orchid family Orchidaceae and is endemic to the south-west of Western Australia. It is a ground orchid with a single flattened, hairy leaf and up to three glossy purple flowers. It has recently been known as Elythranthera brunonis since 1963 but recent discoveries suggest its inclusion in the genus Caladenia.

Description
Caladenia brunonis is a terrestrial, perennial, deciduous, sympodial herb with a few inconspicuous, fine roots and a tuber partly surrounded by a fibrous, multi-layered protective sheath. The sepals and petals spread apart from each other, have blackish tips and are blotched with red or purple on their backs. Flowering occurs from August to early November.

Taxonomy and naming
The purple enamel orchid was first formally described in 1839 by Stephan Endlicher who gave it the name Glossodia brunonis and published the description in Novarum Stirpium Decades. In 1871, Heinrich Reichenbach changed the name to Caladenia brunonis and in 1963, Alex George changed it to Elythranthera brunonis. In 2015, as a result of studies of molecular phylogenetics, Mark Clements changed the name to back Caladenia brunonis. The specific epithet (brunonis) honours the Scottish botanist Robert Brown.

Elythranthera brunonis is regarded as a synonym of the name Caladenia brunonis which is accepted by the Royal Botanic Gardens, Kew.

Distribution and habitat
Caladenia brunonis is a common and widespread species in Western Australia, found as far north as Kalbarri and as far east as Israelite Bay, growing in forest, woodland and heath.

Conservation
Caladenia brunonis is classified as "not threatened" by the Western Australian Government Department of Parks and Wildlife.

References

brunonis
Plants described in 1839
Endemic orchids of Australia
Orchids of Western Australia
Taxa named by Stephan Endlicher